The 1889 Purdue football team was an American football team that represented Purdue University as an independent during the 1889 college football season. The team compiled a 2–1 record in the university's second season fielding an intercollegiate football team. Archaeologist and Harvard alumnus, George Andrew Reisner, was the team's coach. Purdue defeated  the following week, 18–4, and concluded its season on November 29 with a 14–0 loss against . J. M. Sholl was the team captain.

Schedule

References

Purdue
Purdue Boilermakers football seasons
Purdue football